Spektr-RG (Russian: Спектр-РГ, Spectrum + Röntgen + Gamma; also called Spectrum-X-Gamma, SRG, SXG) is a Russian–German high-energy astrophysics space observatory which was launched on 13 July 2019. It follows on from the Spektr-R satellite telescope launched in 2011.

Background
The original idea for this X-ray observatory satellite orbiting above Earth's atmosphere, which filters X-rays, was first proposed in the 1980s by Rashid Sunyaev of the Space Research Institute of the USSR Academy of Sciences. Twenty institutions from twelve countries came together to design a large observatory with five telescopes. However, after the collapse of the Soviet Union, the mission was abandoned due to cost-cutting from the Russian space program Roscosmos. The project was resurrected in 2003 with a scaled-down design.

Overview 

The primary instrument of the mission is eROSITA, built by the Max Planck Institute for Extraterrestrial Physics (MPE) in Germany. It is designed to conduct a seven-year X-ray survey, the first in the medium X-ray band less than 10 keV energies, and the first to map an estimated 100,000 galaxy clusters. This survey may detect new clusters of galaxies and active galactic nuclei. The second instrument, ART-XC, is a Russian high-energy X-ray telescope capable of detecting supermassive black holes.

Spacecraft 
The Spektr-RG mission concept was published in 2005. Construction was finished in 2016, and by mid-2018 it was under integration and testing. It was scheduled to be launched in June 2019 but was delayed to 12 July, before the flight was postponed at the last moment. It launched the next day, 13 July 2019, from Baikonur Site 81/24. The observatory was integrated into a Navigator satellite bus, produced by NPO Lavochkin.

Mission profile and orbit 
The spacecraft entered an orbit around the Sun, circling the Sun-Earth L2 Lagrangian point in a halo orbit, about 1.5 million kilometres away from Earth. Cruise to that location took three months, during which the two telescopes were checked out and calibrated. The next four years were planned to be spent performing eight all-sky surveys. As a goal, the three years after that are planned for observations of selected galaxy clusters and AGNs 
(Active Galactic Nuclei).

On Monday 21 October 2019, Spektr-RG completed a 100-day cruise to L2-point. On 17 October 2019, the main eROSITA instrument achieved first light. The first light image of ART-XC was taken on July 30, 2019.

The operations of eROSITA were suspended on 26 February 2022 after the Russian invasion into Ukraine. At the time, eROSITA had completed four of its planned eight full-sky surveys.

In March 2022, Russia said they turned off one of the two telescopes aboard Spektr-RG (presumably eROSITA) as a response to the German reaction to the Russian invasion of Ukraine. In June, the head of Roscosmos threatened to unilaterally seize control of the German telescope, citing German officials' "pro-fascist views".

Instruments

Optical mission support

Russian
 BTA-6
 Caucasus Mountain Observatory
 RTT-150
 Sayan Solar Observatory
 International Scientific Optical Network

German
 Las Campanas Observatory
 Cerro Tololo Inter-American Observatory
 Paranal Observatory
 La Silla Observatory

See also
 IXPE—a high-resolution X-ray telescope measuring polarization of X-rays
 List of X-ray space telescopes
 ROSAT—observed at similar X-ray energies in the 1990s
 TAUVEX—an instrument originally planned for Spektr-RG; it was built but never flown

References

External links 

 Official site of the project in Russia
 Official site of the eROSITA telescope
 Space telescope to chart first map of the Universe in high-energy X-rays

2019 in Russia
Gamma-ray telescopes
Satellites of Russia
Space telescopes
Spacecraft launched in 2019
Spacecraft launched by Proton rockets
X-ray telescopes
Spacecraft using halo orbits
Artificial satellites at Earth-Sun Lagrange points